The 1872 South Carolina gubernatorial election was held on October 16, 1872 to select the governor of the state of South Carolina. Franklin J. Moses, Jr. won the election as a Radical Republican against the more moderate faction of the Republican Party and became the 75th governor of South Carolina.

Campaign

The state Republicans met in Columbia for their nominating convention on August 21 through August 24. There were 115 black and 33 white delegates to the convention, many of them calling for reform in state government. The nomination for Governor proceeded after the organization of the convention and five men were mentioned, but Franklin J. Moses, Jr. was seen as the clear favorite.

Immediately, accusations of bribery were pegged against each candidate. Former Governor Orr accused Moses of offering a delegate from Barnwell $2,000 for his vote. Tomlinson was alleged by Judge Thomas Mackey to have been giving bribes to ensure the passage of the phosphate bill in 1870.

A vote was taken for the nomination of Governor during the commotion over the accusations of bribery and Moses emerged as the clear winner from the other contenders. Orr denounced the selection and led a walkout by some of the delegates from the convention. The Republican platform adopted at the convention called for a reduction in expenditures and financial reform.

Assembling at the Richland courthouse on August 22, Orr directed the formation of an Independent Republican ticket for the general election in October. Reuben Tomlinson was nominated for Governor and half of the Independent Republican slate for statewide office were black men. The platform consisted entirely of opposing Moses and advocating for reform in state government.

General election
The general election was held on October 16, 1872 and Franklin J. Moses, Jr. was elected as governor of South Carolina by a wide margin. Turnout was lower than the previous election because it was mainly a contest between Republicans; it was estimated that approximately 40,000 white voters did not cast a ballot in the election.

 
|-
| bgcolor="#ff00ff" |
| Independent Republican
| Reuben Tomlinson
| align="right" | 36,533
| align="right" | 34.3
| align="right" | +34.3
|-

|-
| 
| colspan=5 |Republican hold
|-

See also
Governor of South Carolina
List of governors of South Carolina
South Carolina gubernatorial elections

References
"Election Returns for State Officers." Reports and Resolutions of the General Assembly of the State of South Carolina at the Regular Session, 1871-'72. Columbia, SC: Republican Printing Company, 1872, p. 59.

External links
SCIway Biography of Governor Franklin J. Moses, Jr.

1872
Gubernatorial
South Carolina
October 1872 events